County of Buxton is a cadastral unit located in the Australian state of South Australia that covers land located in the centre of Eyre Peninsula.  It was proclaimed in 1896 and named after Thomas Buxton who was the Governor of South Australia from 29 October 1895 to 29 March 1899. It has been divided into thirteen sub-divisions known as hundreds, with the most recent being created in 1928.

Description 
The County of Buxton covers a part of South Australia associated with the eastern side of the centre of Eyre Peninsula located south of the Gawler Ranges.  It is bounded to the west by the County of Le Hunte, to the south by the County of Jervois and to the east by the County of York and to the north by the County of Hore-Ruthven.	

The county is served by the following major roads - the Buckleboo Road which enters the county from the north-west and terminates in Kimba, the Cleve Road which enters from the south and meets the Cowell-Kimba Road which enters from the south-east and terminates in Kimba and the Eyre Highway which passes through the county from east to west.  

Settlements include Kimba, the principal town and municipal seat located on the Eyre Highway,  Buckleboo located in the county's north-west and  Waddikee located in the county's south.

The Cummins to Buckleboo line of the Eyre Peninsula Railway passes into the county from the south and terminates in the locality of Buckleboo.

Land use within the county is divided between primary industry and conservation.  The protected areas are located in the county include the following conservation parks and conservation reserves:
 Conservation parks -  Caralue in the south west, Lake Gilles in the north-east corner, Malgra in the south-east and the eastern end of the Pinkawillinie at the western side.
 Conservation reserves - the Buckleboo, Cunyarie, Lacroma,  Mootra,  Moongi,  Pinkawillinie Reservoir, and Tola Conservation Reserves are located in the county's centre adjoining the alignment of the Cummins to Buckleboo line of the Eyre Peninsula railway, and the Poolgarra Conservation Reserve located in the county's south-west corner.

Its extent includes the local government area of the District Council of Kimba with the state's Pastoral Unincorporated Area occupying land along its northern and north-eastern sides.

History
The County of Buxton was proclaimed under the Crown Lands Act 1888 on 13 August 1896 along with the Hundred of Kelly.

The naming of the county after Governor Buxton who was the Governor of South Australia from 29 October1895 to 29 March 1899, by the South Australian government follows "a precedent which was established in 1842" when a county was named after Governor Gawler.

The following hundreds have been proclaimed within the county - Kelly in 1896, Solomon in 1909, Cortlinye and Moseley in 1914, Barna, Caralue and Yalanda in 1917, Buckleboo, Cunyarie and Pinkawillinie in 1922, Wilcherry in 1924, O'Connor in 1925 and Panitya in 1928.

Constituent hundreds

Location of constituent hundreds
The hundreds are laid out in four columns in the west–east direction as follows:	
 Caralue, Panitya, Pinkawillinie and Buckleboo from south to north along the county's western boundary.
Solomon, Cortlinye and Cunyarie.
Kelly, Moseley and Wilcherry.
The most easterly column of hundreds consists of the Hundreds of Yalanda, Barna and O'Connor in the south-east corner of the county with the land in the north-east corner of the county has not proclaimed as one or more hundreds.

Hundred of Barna 
The Hundred of Barna was proclaimed on 26 July 1917. The locality of Barna occupies most of the hundred with a part of the locality of Yalanda occupying some land on its southern boundary.

Hundred of Buckleboo 
The Hundred of Buckleboo was proclaimed on 1 June 1922. The locality of Buckleboo occupies most of the hundred with the locality of Bungeroo occupying the hundred's north-eastern corner.

Hundred of Caralue 
The Hundred of Caralue was proclaimed on 26 July 1917. The locality of  Caralue occupies most of the hundred with a portion of the locality of Panitya extending from the north into the hundred to the north boundary of the Caralue Bluff Conservation Park while the south-east corner is occupied by part of the locality of Waddikee.

Hundred of Cortlinye 
The Hundred of Caralue was proclaimed on 1 October 1914. The locality of Cortlinye occupies most of the hundred with a portion of the locality of  Kimba extending from the south into the hundred.

Hundred of Cunyarie 
The Hundred of Cunyarie was proclaimed on 1 June 1922. The locality of Cunyarie occupies most of the hundred while its northern end is occupied by part of the locality of Yeltana to the west and by part of the locality of Uno to the east.

Hundred of Kelly 
The Hundred of Kelly was proclaimed on 13 August 1896. The locality of Kelly occupies most of the hundred with its north-western corner containing part of the locality of Kimba.

Hundred of Moseley
The Hundred of Moseley was proclaimed on 1 October 1914. The locality of  Moseley occupies most of the hundred with its north-eastern corner containing parts of the localities of Lake Gilles and Uno.

Hundred of O'Connor
The Hundred of O'Connor  was proclaimed on 24 September 1925. The boundaries of the hundred lie within those of the locality of Lake Gilles.

Hundred of Panitya
The Hundred of Panitya was proclaimed on 28 June 1928. The northern side of the hundred is within the locality of Pinkawillinie while its southern side is within the locality of Panitya.

Hundred of Pinkawillinie

The Hundred of Pinkawillinie was proclaimed on 1 June 1922. The boundaries of the hundred lie within those of the locality of Pinkawillinie.

Hundred of Solomon
The Hundred of Solomon  was proclaimed on 21 January 1909. The locality of Solomon occupies most of the hundred with its south-western corner containing part of the locality of Waddikee and its north-eastern corner containing part of the locality of Kimba.

Hundred of Wilcherry
The Hundred of Wilcherry was proclaimed on 18 December 1924. The locality of Wilcherry occupies the south-eastern corner of the hundred while the remainder is occupied by part of the locality of Uno.

Hundred of Yalanda
The Hundred of Yalanda  was proclaimed on 26 July 1917. The locality of Yalanda occupies most of the hundred with a part of the locality of Kelly occupying some land on its western boundary.

See also
Lands administrative divisions of South Australia
Buxton (disambiguation)

References

Buxton
Buxton
Far North (South Australia)